Souk El Haddadine , also called the Market of BlackSmiths or Souk El Haddadine and El Najjarine, or the Market of BlackSmiths and Joiners, is one of the souks, or markets, of the medina of Sfax, Tunisia.

Localization 
The souk is located near Bab Jebli in the East and takes a turn with the start of Nahj El Bey (Alley of the Bey).

History 
It used to be joined in one part but got divided later on into two separate parts : one for BlackSmiths and the other for Joiners like it still is today along with some other changes.

A joiner in the tradition of the medina of Sfax is someone who chops the wood from olive trees and other similar ones to create agricultural machines and eating bowls and other bigger eating bowls called Mithrad.

References 

El Haddadine